"Mister Love" is a 7" single by Toadies.  It was released in 1993 on clear yellow vinyl by Grass Records; manufactured and distributed by Dutch East India Trading.

The song "Mister Love" appears in identical form on the 1992 Velvet cassette EP. While the song "I Burn" can be found elsewhere, the track as presented here is an early electric version exclusive to this release. Both songs were later re-recorded for the band's major label debut, Rubberneck.

Track listing
"Mister Love" (Lewis) - 2:32
"I Burn" (Lewis) - 3:40

(P) 1993 Grass Records.

Personnel
Todd Lewis - vocals
Charles Mooney III - guitar
Darrel Herbert - guitar
Lisa Umbarger - bass
Mark Reznicek - drums

References
Toadies. "Mister Love". Grass, 1993. 7" single.
Toadies. Velvet. Self-released, 1992. Cassette.

1993 singles
Song recordings produced by Tom Rothrock
1993 songs
Toadies songs